The 1959 Green Bay Packers season was their 39th season in the National Football League and 41st overall. The team finished with a 7–5 record in the  season under first-year coach Vince Lombardi to earn a third-place finish in the Western Conference.

It was the Packers' first winning season in a dozen years, the last was a 6–5–1 mark in 1947. Green Bay had just one victory during the previous season in 1958 with the worst record in the twelve-team league, and were 3–9 in 1957, tied for worst. Hired in early February, Lombardi was previously the offensive coach (coordinator) for the New York Giants under head coach Jim Lee Howell.

Offseason

NFL draft

Yellow indicates a future Pro Bowl selection

The Lombardi Era begins
On February 4, 1959, Vince Lombardi seized his opportunity and began building his football dynasty in Green Bay. He arrived after both phases of the draft (December 1 and January 21), and started by trading away the Packers' best receiver of the decade, Billy Howton, to the Cleveland Browns. To bring some much-needed leadership to the defensive backfield, Lombardi obtained future Hall of Famer Emlen Tunnell from the New York Giants. He also acquired Fuzzy Thurston from the Baltimore Colts and defensive tackle Henry Jordan from Cleveland by the start of training camp. In all, 16 veterans from the previous season were sent packing as Lombardi installed a new attitude in the Packers' locker room.

Training camp
Lombardi borrowed from the Giants model — the players had to feel like champions. The team traveled first class under the philosophy that "you can't be a winner unless you feel like one." The change in culture was pronounced. Lombardi had to find a quarterback, and he was resistant to making Bart Starr the quarterback. Starr was in his fourth year in the league and hadn't won a game in which he'd played four quarters. "Did Bart tell you how bad he was?" a player was to later quip to biographer John Eisenberg. Former Razorback Lamar McHan beat out Starr, while veteran Babe Parilli was cut in mid-September, along with rookie running back Alex Hawkins, the thirteenth overall selection in the

Master plan
Through his now-legendary coaching style, Lombardi whipped the underachieving Packers into instant winners. He set his plan immediately into action at his very first team meeting. "I have never been on a losing team, gentlemen, and I do not intend to start now!"

Dramatic improvement
The results of Lombardi's approach were dramatic. In the season opener against the Chicago Bears, the Packers held on to win 9–6 and celebrated the victory by carrying their new head coach off the field. In his first year on the sidelines, the Packers posted their first winning record since 1947. The team's quick turnaround netted Lombardi unanimous honors as NFL coach of the year.

Schedule

Preseason

Regular season

Lombardi's first regular season game as Packers coach was on September 27. In front of 32,150 fans, the Packers won the game. In the final seven minutes, the Packers put up nine points to win the game by a score of 9–6. Jim Taylor scored a touchdown to put the Packers on the scoreboard. Max McGee would have a sixty-one-yard punt which would land on the Bears 2-yard line. The punt set up the final score of the game. Hawg Hanner scored a safety on Bears quarterback Ed Brown. After the game, Jim Ringo grabbed the game ball and gave it to Lombardi. 

Note: Intra-conference opponents are in bold text.

Game summaries

Regular season

Week 1: vs. Chicago Bears

Standings

Roster

Awards, records, and honors
Vince Lombardi, Coach of the Year

Milestones

References

Sportsencyclopedia.com

Green Bay Packers
Green Bay Packers seasons